Hutchison is an unincorporated community in Bourbon County, Kentucky, in the United States.

History
Hutchison (formerly called Hutchison's) was a station on the Kentucky Central Railroad. A post office was established at Hutchison in 1856, and remained in operation until it was discontinued in 1930.

References

Unincorporated communities in Bourbon County, Kentucky
Unincorporated communities in Kentucky